Infiltration is a 2022 Russian war drama film written and directed by Aleksey Chadov is the lead actor, it is the sequel to the 2002 film War.

This film was theatrically released on June 2, 2022, by "Nashe Kino" ( "Our Cinema").

Plot 
War is over. Ivan came home. But even years later, he continues to play it, as a result of which his wife left him. And he decides to go to Syria.

Cast 
 Aleksey Chadov as Ivan Yermakov
 Vitali Kishchenko as "Gray"
 Kristina Asmus as Alyona Yermakova, Ivan Yermakov's wife
 Viktor Sukhorukov as Ivanych
 Dzhalil Asretov as Zakir
 Neviya Tafara as a little local girl
 Ola Keyru as Steven, commander of the USMC
 Nikita Kologrivyy as Sergey "Artist"
 Alexander Krasovsky as Sergey "Vityaz"
 Petr Korolev as Max "Falcon"
 Sergey Borisov as Andrew "Commander"
 Eugenia Lezgintseva as Alyona's friend

Production 
The film companies "22" and "CTB" were engaged in production. The development was carried out with the support of the Cinema Fund.

The script began to be written in February 2019 after Aleksey Chadov attended events in Yekaterinburg dedicated to the work of Aleksei Balabanov and the film War (2002 film), which almost twenty years ago gave a powerful start to Chadov's career. The script writing process lasted two months, and principal photography began on July 29, 2020.

Principal photography process took place in Moscow and the Republic of Crimea, near Sudak, near Kapsel Bay near the art cluster "Tavrida", and Syria.

References

External links 
 Official website at the CTB Film Company 
 

2022 films
2020s Russian-language films
2022 war drama films
Russian sequel films
Films about Russian military operations in Syria
Russian war drama films
Films shot in Moscow
Films shot in Crimea
Films shot in Russia
Films shot in Syria